Incorruptibility is a Roman Catholic and Eastern Orthodox belief that divine intervention allows some human bodies (specifically saints and beati) to completely or partially avoid the normal process of decomposition after death as a sign of their holiness. 

Incorruptibility is thought to occur even in the presence of factors which normally hasten decomposition, as in the cases of saints Catherine of Genoa, Julie Billiart and Francis Xavier.

Roman Catholicism
In Roman Catholicism, if a body is judged as incorruptible after death, this is most often seen as a sign that the individual is a saint. Canon law allows inspection of the body so that relics can be taken and sent to Rome. The relics must be sealed with wax and the body must be replaced after inspection. These ritual inspections are performed very rarely and can only be performed by a bishop according to the requirements of canon law. A pontifical commission can authorize inspection of the relics and demand a written report. After solemn inspection of the relics, it can be decided that the body is presented in an open reliquary and displayed for veneration. Catholic law allows saints to be buried under the altar, so Mass can be celebrated above the remains.

The remains of Bernadette Soubirous were inspected multiple times, and reports by the church tribunal confirmed that the body was preserved. The opening of the coffin was attended by multiple canons, the mayor and the bishop in 1919, and repeated in 1925. However, the face and hands were covered with a wax mask.

Not every saint, however, is expected to have an incorruptible corpse. Although believers see incorruptibility as supernatural, it is no longer counted as a miracle in the recognition of a saint.

Embalmed bodies were not recognized as incorruptibles. For example, although the body of Pope John XXIII remained in a remarkably intact state after its exhumation, Church officials remarked that the body had been embalmed and additionally there was a lack of oxygen in his sealed triple coffin.

Incorruptibility is seen as distinct from the good preservation of a body, or from mummification. Incorruptible bodies are often said to have the odour of sanctity, exuding a sweet or floral, pleasant aroma.

Saints

Beatified 
 Saint Margaret of Castello
 Alfredo Ildefonso Schuster
 Pier Giorgio Frassati
 Charles I of Austria
 Maria Angela Astorch
 Sebastian de Aparicio

Eastern Orthodoxy 

To the Eastern Orthodox, a distinction is made between natural mummification and what is believed to be supernatural incorruptibility. While incorruptibility is not generally deemed to be a prerequisite for sainthood, there are reportedly many Eastern Orthodox saints whose bodies have been found to be incorrupt and are in much veneration. These include:
 Saint Alexander of Svir – the incorrupt relics of the saint were removed from the Svir Monastery by the Bolsheviks on December 20, 1918, after several unsuccessful attempts to confiscate them. Finally, the holy relics were sent to Petrograd's Military Medical Academy. There they remained for nearly eighty years. A second uncovering of St Alexander's relics took place in December 1997, before their return to the Svir Monastery.
 Saints Anthony, John, and Eustathios
 Saint Dionysios of Zakynthos
 Saint Elizabeth
 Saint Gerasimus of Kefalonia
 Saint Ioasaph of Belgorod – In 1918 the Bolsheviks removed Saint Ioasaph's relics from his shrine in the cathedral of the Holy Trinity at Belgorod, and for some seventy years, their whereabouts remained unknown. In 1927, the cathedral itself was demolished. In the late 1980s, the relics were discovered in Leningrad's Museum of Religion and Atheism, and on 16 September 1991, they were solemnly returned to the new Cathedral of the Transfiguration of Our Lord in Belgorod, in the presence of Patriarch Alexy II.
 Saint Job of Pochayiv
 Saint John Maximovitch of Shanghai and San Francisco
 Saint John the Russian
 Saint Nectarios of Aegina
 Saint Parascheva of the Balkans
 Saint Spyridon
 Saint Zosima

Judaism

Rabbi Louis Ginzberg in his monumental "Legends of the Jews" (Vol. 4, Chapter 10) based on the Jewish Apocrypha and Aggadah mentions an alleged case of bodily incorruptibility of the Biblical Baruch, scribe of Jeremiah (whose tomb is found in Iraq).

See also 
 Gisant
 Bog body
 Buddhist mummies
 Paramahansa Yogananda
 Sokushinbutsu
 Sufism
 Shahid

Footnotes

Literature  
 Cruz, Joan Carroll (1977 and 1991).
 Jeremiah, Ken (2012). Christian Mummification: An Interpretive History of the Preservation of Saints, Martyrs and Others, OCDS, McFarland & Co., Inc. .

External links 

 
 St Dionysios of Zakynthos
 St Spyridon the Wonderworker and Bishop of Tremithus

Death
 
Christian miracles

Christian relics